Lee Yee-man ( born October 18, 1984 in Hong Kong) is a Hong Kong actress and host. She won the 2001 ATV actress competition, and began her acting career at ATV. Later, in 2007 she began acting for TVB.

ATV Series

TVB Series

Film
 Shock Wave (2017)

References

TVB actors
Living people
Year of birth missing (living people)